Andorra competed at the 2012 Summer Olympics in London, United Kingdom from 27 July to 12 August 2012. This nation marked its tenth appearance at the Olympic games.

The Andorra Olympic Committee sent a total of six athletes to the Games, sharing the same record, both by gender and by overall, with Athens. Sprinter Cristina Llovera was the youngest athlete of the team, at age 15. Meanwhile, trap shooter Joan Tomàs Roca, the oldest of the team at age 61, competed at his fifth Olympics since its national debut in Montreal. For being the team's most experienced member, Roca was appointed by the committee to be the nation's flag bearer at the opening ceremony. Andorra, however, has yet to win its first ever Olympic medal.

Athletics

Andorran athletes have so far achieved qualifying standards in the following athletics events (up to a maximum of 3 athletes in each event at the 'A' Standard, and 1 at the 'B' Standard):

Men

Women

Judo

Andorra has qualified 1 judoka.

Shooting

Men

Swimming

Men

Women

References

External links
 

Nations at the 2012 Summer Olympics
2012
2012 in Andorran sport